Іrina Anatolyevna Belousova is a Candidate of Economic Sciences (1996), a former Member of Verkhovna Rada, Lytvyn Bloc fraction (from November 2007 till December 2012).

Biography
Іrina Belousova was born on 10 July 1954, in the settlement of Yugoryonok in Ust-Maysky District of the Yakut ASSR, Russian SFSR, Soviet Union.

Education
She graduated from Kyiv National Economic Institute, Department of Accounting and Economics (studied in 1974-1978), majoring in Accounting. In 1996 she received her PhD with the thesis "Recording and analysis of production efficiency (based on arts and crafts enterprises of Ukraine)".

Career
1978-1981 - worked as engineer, senior accountant, senior economist at the Ministry of Local Industry of the Ukrainian Soviet Republic.
1981-1984 — senior accountant, Head of the financial department at Republic Association of arts and crafts, Ministry of Local Industry of the Ukrainian Soviet Republic.
1984-1986 - Head of the financial department, chief accountant at industrial association Ukrlyonokonopleprom.
1986-1988 — Head of Accounting and Reporting at the Ministry of Light Industry of the Ukrainian SSR.
1988-1991 — Deputy Head of Economic Affairs at the trust "Ukrremlehbud".
1991-1992 - Director of finance and credit center, chief accountant of the Association "Perspective"
1992-1995 - chief accountant at the research and service center "Pikom"
1995-1998 - Director of the audit company "Multi-audit".
2001-2002 — state commissioner of the Antimonopoly Committee of Ukraine
2002-2004 - Deputy Chairman and the state commissioner of the Antimonopoly Committee of Ukraine

Ukrainian Parliament
March 1998 - April 2002 - People's Deputy of Ukraine in the 3rd Verkhovna Rada, No 14 on the list from the Party of Greens of Ukraine. Secretary of the Committee on economic policy, agricultural management, property and investments (since 1998), a member of the Party of Greens of Ukraine fraction (since 1998)
2002 - candidate for People's Deputy from the association "Women for the Future», No. 3 on the list
2006 - candidate for People's Deputy from the opposition bloc "Ne Tak!", No. 11 on the list. At election time she was a PhD at Zhytomyr State Technological University
2008 - candidate for People's Deputy from Lytvyn Bloc, No. 16 on the list
Member of the Group on Interparliamentary Relations with the Austrian Republic
Member of the Group on Interparliamentary Relations with Russian Federation
Member of the Group on Interparliamentary Relations with the Federal Republic of Germany
Member of the Group on Interparliamentary Relations with the Republic of Estonia

Deputy Chairman of the Verkhovna Rada of Ukraine on economic policy.

Belousova did not participate in the 2012 Ukrainian parliamentary election and 2014 Ukrainian parliamentary election.

See also
2007 Ukrainian parliamentary election
List of Ukrainian Parliament Members 2007
Verkhovna Rada

References

External links
 Irina Belousova' profile at Verkhovna Rada of Ukraine official web-site

1954 births
Living people
People from Ust-Maysky District
Ukrainian people of Russian descent
Strong Ukraine politicians
Third convocation members of the Verkhovna Rada
Sixth convocation members of the Verkhovna Rada
21st-century Ukrainian women politicians
20th-century Ukrainian women politicians
Women members of the Verkhovna Rada